Spica has been borne by at least four ships of the Italian Navy and may refer to:

 , a  launched in 1905 and discarded in 1923.
 , a  launched in 1934. Sold to Sweden in 1940 and renamed HSwMS Romulus. Decommissioned in 1958.
 , an  captured before launch by Germany in 1943. She was renamed TA45 and launched in 1944. Sunk in 1945.
 , a  launched in 1989. 

Italian Navy ship names